The Draper Hall Annex is a single-story office building which houses emergency medical services at the University of Massachusetts Amherst. The building is adjoined to Draper Hall, and has served as an office space, classroom, and at one time, home to the university's polymer science research.

History
After the second World War, UMass received an influx of applicants due to financial aid from the G.I. Bill, and in order to accommodate the growing number of students, the university had to undergo a rapid expansion in a relatively short period of time. The Draper Annex was constructed in 1947 as a result of this demand, and for a number of years would serve as additional classroom and office space for university's the business and agricultural departments.

In 1961 the building changed functions, and became the main offices for the university's Polymer Research Institute and the home of the new Department of Polymer Science and Engineering in 1974.

The annex was occupied by the Five College Radio Astronomy Observatory program in the 1970s, and for many years housed the observatory machine shop on the main floor and excess storage in the basement.

With the completion of the Silvio O. Conte National Center for Polymer Research in 1996, the department of polymer science would vacate the annex, as this new complex was capable of housing all the department's operations under one roof. Subsequently, the UMass Emergency Medical Services relocated to the building, which continues to serve as their office and classroom space to this day.

See also
Draper Hall

References

External links
UMass Emergency Medical Services

University of Massachusetts Amherst buildings
1947 establishments in Massachusetts
University and college buildings completed in 1947